Giuseppe Franzelli (born 9 April 1942), is an Italian-born Roman Catholic priest who served as Bishop of the Roman Catholic Diocese of Lira, from 1 April 2005 until 23 November 2018.

Background and priesthood
Franzelli was born in Roccafranca, Italy, on 9 April 1942.
He professed as a member of the Comboni Missionaries of the Heart of Jesus (MCCI), in 1963. He was ordained to the priesthood on 11 March 1967.

As bishop
On 1 April 2005, he was appointed Bishop of Lira, Uganda. He was consecrated bishop by Archbishop John Baptist Odama, Archbishop of Gulu, assisted by Bishop Paul Lokiru Kalanda†, Bishop Emeritus of Fort Portal and Bishop Joseph Oyanga†, Bishop Emeritus of Lira. The consecration ceremony was held at Aki Bua Memorial Stadium, in the city of Lira, in Lira District, Lango sub-region, in the Northern Region of Uganda.

He retired as bishop on 23 November 2018, at the age of 76 years and 7 months. As of July 2019, he is living as Bishop Emeritus of Lira, Uganda.

See also
 Uganda Martyrs
 Roman Catholicism in Uganda

Succession table

References

External links

About Bishop Giuseppe Franzelli, M.C.C.I.: Bishop Emeritus of Lira, Uganda
Monsigneur Giuseppe Franzelli: "Pope In Uganda To Overcome Divisions"

1942 births
Living people
21st-century Roman Catholic bishops in Uganda
Italian Roman Catholic bishops in Africa
Roman Catholic bishops of Lira